John J. Ellington (born October 26, 1960) is an associate justice of the Supreme Court of Georgia and former judge of the Georgia Court of Appeals.

Early life and education 

Ellington was born in Vidalia, Georgia on October 26, 1960. He graduated from the University of Georgia with a Bachelor of Business Administration in Accounting in 1982, and from the University of Georgia School of Law with a Juris Doctor in 1985.

Legal career 

Ellington began his career as a general trial lawyer and a partner with the law firm of Andrew, Threlkeld, & Ellington.

State court service 

In 1991, he was appointed to serve as judge of the Treutlen County State Court. He also served as a municipal court judge and later as a superior court judge. He  was sworn in as the 66th Judge of the Georgia Court of Appeals by Governor Roy Barnes on July 12, 1999. He was elected statewide to a full six-year term in 2000 and re-elected in 2006 and 2012.

Service on Georgia Supreme Court 

Ellington was considered in 2016 for one of three seats on the court. In early 2018 Ellington announced his intention to run for the state Supreme Court seat being vacated by retiring Justice Carol W. Hunstein. He was elected, unopposed, on November 6, 2018. He was sworn into office on December 19, 2018.

References

External links 

1960 births
Living people
21st-century American judges
Georgia Court of Appeals judges
Georgia (U.S. state) Republicans
People from Vidalia, Georgia
Justices of the Supreme Court of Georgia (U.S. state)
University of Georgia alumni
University of Georgia School of Law alumni